The Holy Office is a 1974 Mexican drama film directed by Arturo Ripstein. It was nominated for the Palme d'Or at the 1974 Cannes Film Festival and won the Silver Goddess for Best Film in 1974 awarded by the Mexican Cinema Journalists.

Cast
  - Luis de Carvajal (?)
 Diana Bracho - Mariana de Carvajal (?)
 Claudio Brook - Alonso de Peralta
 Ana Mérida - Francisca
 Arturo Beristáin - Baltasar
 Martha Navarro - Catalina Morales
 Silvia Mariscal - Justa Méndez
 Antonio Bravo - Rabine Morales
 Peter Gonzales Falcón - Fray Gaspar (as Peter Gonzales)
 Mario Castillón Bracho - Gregorio López
 Farnesio de Bernal - Fray Hernando
 Rafael Banquells - Principal of the Real Audience
 Jorge Fegán - Padre Oroz
 Martín LaSalle - Díaz Márquez
 Florencio Castelló - Fray Lorenzo de Albornoz
 Carlos Nieto - Inquisidor Juan Lobo Guerrero
 Nathanael León - Monje
 Carlos Pouliot - Amante de Justa Méndez
 Cecilia Leger
 Juan José Martínez Casado - Carcelero
 Rodolfo Velez - Cocinero
 Luz Elena Silva 
 Ramón Menéndez - Manuel de Lucena

References

External links

1974 films
Latin-language films
1970s Hebrew-language films
1970s Spanish-language films
1974 drama films
Films directed by Arturo Ripstein
Mexican drama films
1974 multilingual films
Mexican multilingual films
1970s Mexican films